Zawiyet Sidi Amar Cherif, or Zawiyet Sidi Daoud, is a zawiya school located in Boumerdès Province in Algeria.

Construction
The zawiya was built in 1745 in the eastern heights of the current town of Boumerdès in the Kabylia region. It was founded by scholar Sidi Amar Cherif.

Missions
The zawiya is considered a prominent religious teacher for teaching the Quran and its basic rulings to young people. It also provides the various mosques of Boumerdes Province during the month of Ramadan every year with a preservation that leads to Tarawih prayers by reciting the Quran with the Warsh recitation.

This zawiya has had dozens of male and female Hafiz graduates.

It is a place to study and teach the Quran, as well as providing aid to the needy and those about to get married and organizing circumcision ceremonies.

It is one of the Zawiyas in Algeria that plays an important role in social life in the Sidi Daoud region. It is considered a modernized school, as it is based on the traditional and modern way of teaching the Quran and Sunnah as well.

French conquest

When the French landed in Algiers during 1830 and the period of Ottoman Algeria gave way to an African state dislocated and invaded by colonial troops of the invading French Army, the zawiya of Sahel Bouberak could no longer be satisfied with their level of education in Sufism. Therefore, Cheikh Cherifi soon allied with Cheikh Ben Zamoum to counter the advance of French colonial appetites towards Kabylia and the valleys of Oued Isser and Oued Sebaou until 1837.

The turn of military events in Mitidja ended in 1837 with a recurrence of conflict. The Emirate of Abdelkader, represented by his younger brother Emir Mustapha (Bey in Beylik of Titteri), with murids of the zawiyas of Lower Kabylia, organized a surprise attack on 8 May 1837 on a large agricultural farm in Reghaia managed by the two colonists Mercier and Saussine.

This zawiya, affiliated with the Rahmaniyya brotherhood, played a crucial role (along with the Sheikhs of Zawiyet Sidi Boushaki and Zawiyet Sidi Boumerdassi) in triggering the Kabyle response against colonial expansion east of the Casbah of Algiers.

The looting and sacking of the farm bordering the Khachna Massif could not leave the belligerents in a situation of calm and ceasefire. Therefore, General Damrémont took advantage of this Algerian attack to raise the military forces stationed in Algiers under the direction of General Perregaux and Colonel Schauenburg to organize a punitive expedition against the Kabyles of the tribes of Beni Aïcha, Issers and Amraoua among the Iflissen Lebhar.

The Zawiyet Sidi Amar Cherif participated in unveiling the lure of peace with the French colonizers, who rushed at this opportunity to try to attack the Kabyles, starting 17 May 1837, which ended in failure on the bank of Oued Isser due to bad weather and ignorance of the escarpment of the hills of the Col des Beni Aïcha.

Cheikh Cherifi, Cheikh Ben Zamoum and Cheikh Boushaki took advantage of the defeat of the French soldiers to pursue them to their camp in Boudouaou on 25 May, but reinforcements arriving from Algiers ended up overturning the First Battle of Boudouaou in favor of the French, commanded by Captain Antoine de La Torré on 30 May.

The zawiya of Sidi Daoud entered fully into the resistance against the French conquest of Algeria and continued until the independence of Algeria in 1962.

Notable people

 
 Cheikh Mohamed Cherifi
 Mohamed Seghir Boushaki (1869–1959)
 Ali Boushaki (1855–1965)
 Abderrahmane Boushaki (1896-1985)
 Brahim Boushaki (1912–1997)
 Mehdi Boualem
 Ahmed Mebtouche
 Abdelkader Hammami
 Abdelkader Hasbellaoui
 Mohamed Hamek
 Cheikh Meddahi
 Cheikh Kezadri

See also

 Algerian Islamic reference
 Zawiyas in Algeria
 Qadiriyya
 Rahmaniyya
 Emir Abdelkader
 Emir Mustapha
 Mokrani Revolt
 Messali Hadj
 Algeria War
 Sebaou River
 Raid on Reghaïa (1837)
 Expedition of the Col des Beni Aïcha
 First Battle of Boudouaou

External links

Bibliography

References

1745 establishments
Sufism in Algeria
Zawiyas in Algeria
Buildings and structures in Boumerdès Province
18th-century establishments in Africa
Islamic architecture
Islamic education in Algeria
Education in Algeria
Educational organisations based in Algeria
Islamic education